Méaulte is a commune in the Somme department in Hauts-de-France in northern France.

Geography

Population

Personalities
 Henry Potez  (1891–1981), aeroplane maker, was born in Méaulte. He built a factory here and began making Potez aeroplanes in 1924.  Today, the factory is part of the pan-European group Airbus

See also
Communes of the Somme department

References

Communes of Somme (department)